The 2014 Southern Arkansas Muleriders football team represented Southern Arkansas University in the 2014 NCAA Division II football season. The team was coached by Bill Keopple, who finished his sixth season as head coach at SAU. The Muleriders played their home games at Wilkins Stadium in Magnolia, Arkansas and competed in the Great American Conference (GAC).

Schedule

Southern Arkansas Muleriders
Southern Arkansas Muleriders football seasons
Southern Arkansas Muleriders